Collie's squirrel (Sciurus colliaei) is a tree squirrel in the genus Sciurus endemic to Mexico.

Distribution 
The Collie's squirrel is native to the western coast of Mexico, including the states of Sonora, Chihuahua, Sinaloa, Durango, Nayarit, Jalisco, and Colima. The species inhabits areas of thick tropical and subtropical vegetation, especially in Jalisco. It is also known to occupy subtropical canyons in the northern part of its range.

Description 
Sometimes referred to as a "gray squirrel" in Mexico, the Collie's squirrel is a medium-sized squirrel with a gray coat. The back (dorsum) is usually a darker gray with a yellowish wash down to the tail's base. The species sides are usually a light gray and the underside is typically white, although it can sometimes be a light orange color. The top of the tail, with the exception of the base, is black with a white wash. The underside of the tail is gray and the sides white.

Recorded measurements of the Collie's squirrel average female specimens as measuring 243.4mm from head to base of tail and 260.4mm on the length of the tail. Males were recorded as measuring 248.6mm head to base of tail and 243.2mm on the length of the tail. Females were recorded as weighing 440.8g and males 335.2g.

Behaviour 
The Collie's squirrel lives chiefly in trees and is diurnal, most active just after sunrise and before sunset. They have been reported to nest on outer tree branches and within tree trunks' cavities, as well as abandoned termite nests. It is believed that the species breed in March and April.

Diet 
Collie's squirrels have a specialized diet of the fruits and nuts of palms, figs, and possibly oaks.

References

Endemic mammals of Mexico
Sciurus
Mammals described in 1839
Taxonomy articles created by Polbot
Sinaloan dry forests